Moving Target is a studio album by American spoken-word poet and blues musician Gil Scott-Heron.

Background, production, release
The album, released on Arista in 1982, was to be his last for more than a decade. On Moving Target, Scott-Heron and his "Midnight Band" recorded their "typical, tastefully jazzy R&B and funk grooves", though flavored with "more exotic sounds" and influenced by reggae (there are echoes of Bob Marley in some songs). The final song, the almost ten-minute long "Black History/The World", is in part a spoken-word performance by Scott-Heron ending with a "plea for peace and world change".

The album, co-produced by Malcolm Cecil, was released in September 1982 on LP (#204921), and issued as a CD in February 1997, under the same number. Robert Christgau gave the album a B.

Track listing
All tracks composed by Gil Scott-Heron; except where indicated
"Fast Lane" (lyrics: Scott-Heron; music: Robbie Gordon) - 4:55
"Washington D.C." - 4:13
"No Exit" - 4:08
"Blue Collar" - 5:18
"Ready or Not" (lyrics: Scott-Heron; music: Larry McDonald) - 4:10
"Explanations" - 4:33
"Black History/The World" - 9:42

Personnel
Gil Scott-Heron - vocals; electric piano on "Washington D.C."
Vernon James - alto saxophone; flute on "Ready or Not"
Robbie Gordon - bass
Kenny Powell - drums
Ed Brady - guitar
Glen Turner - keyboards
Carl Cornwell  - tenor saxophone (tracks 2, 3, 7)
Ron Holloway - tenor saxophone
Kenny Sheffield - trumpet
Larry McDonald - percussion
"High Note" Harry Kim - trumpet on "Washington D.C."
Malcolm Cecil - horn arrangement on "Fast Lane"

Technical personnel
Malcolm Cecil - engineer, co-producer
Alan Douglas - second engineer
Richard Mannering  - second engineer
Denis Heron - coordinator, production assistant
Bob Carboni - mastering
Donn Davenport - artwork
John Ford - photography
Recorded at Bias Studio, Springfield, Virginia (March 25–27 and May 28–29, 1982); Townhouse Studios, London (April 9–12, 1982); The Manor Studio, Oxford (April 19–21, 1982); and Record Plant, Los Angeles (June 7–17, 1982). Mixed at Record Plant. Mastered at A&M Studios, Los Angeles (July 1982).

References

1982 albums
Gil Scott-Heron albums
Albums produced by Malcolm Cecil
Arista Records albums
Rhythm and blues albums by American artists